Zagrody may refer to the following places:
Zagrody, Gmina Goraj in Lublin Voivodeship (east Poland)
Zagrody, Gmina Tarnogród in Lublin Voivodeship (east Poland)
Zagrody, Chełm County in Lublin Voivodeship (east Poland)
Zagrody, Lublin County in Lublin Voivodeship (east Poland)
Zagrody, Puławy County in Lublin Voivodeship (east Poland)
Zagrody, Lesser Poland Voivodeship (south Poland)
Zagrody, Busko County in Świętokrzyskie Voivodeship (south-central Poland)
Zagrody, Kielce County in Świętokrzyskie Voivodeship (south-central Poland)
Zagrody, Sandomierz County in Świętokrzyskie Voivodeship (south-central Poland)
Zagrody, Staszów County in Świętokrzyskie Voivodeship (south-central Poland)
Zagrody, West Pomeranian Voivodeship (north-west Poland)